Tereza Tobiášová (born 10 April 1974) is a Czech beach volleyball player. She competed in the women's tournament at the 2000 Summer Olympics.

References

External links
 

1974 births
Living people
Czech women's beach volleyball players
Olympic beach volleyball players of the Czech Republic
Beach volleyball players at the 2000 Summer Olympics
Sportspeople from Brno